Smelser Creek is a stream in Pettis County in the U.S. state of Missouri. It is a tributary of Muddy Creek.

 
Smelser Creek has the name of an early settler.

See also
List of rivers of Missouri

References

Rivers of Pettis County, Missouri
Rivers of Missouri